Filippo Tortu (born 15 June 1998) is an Italian sprinter with a personal best in the 100 meters of 9.99, the first Italian in history to break the 10 seconds barrier. He won the gold medal in 100 metres at the 2017 European U20 Championships and the silver medal at the 2016 World U20 Championships. He ran the anchor leg in the 4×100m relay of the Italian team that won the gold medal at the 2020 Summer Olympics. He won the bronze medal in 200 metres at the 2022 European Championships. He is coached by his father, Salvino Tortu, a former Sardinian sprinter who moved to Lombardy.

Biography
Born in Milan but with Sardinian origins (his father, Salvino Tortu, is a former runner too), he began to play sports at the age of eight years, dividing his time between track and field and basketball.

In 2010 and 2011, he won the title of fastest runner in Milan while competing in the categories prima media and seconda media (first and second years of middle school). He then started to dedicate himself entirely to track and field, coached by his father. In 2013, he won the 80 meters in the Italian championships in Jesolo (category cadetto) with a time of 9.09.

He finished third at the 2014 trials for the European Youth Olympic Games although he did not qualify. He did however qualify for the 200 meters, but in the preliminary race for the Youth Olympics he fell at the finish line; he broke both arms and as a result was not able to compete in the finals. In 2015, he broke the Italian youth record in the 100 meters with a time of 10.33, as well as in the 200 meters with a time of 20.92. 
 
In 2016, he broke the Italian junior record of 100 meters in Savona, twice obtaining a time of 10.24; this record had been unbeaten for 34 years, and was held by Pierfrancesco Pavoni who ran the distance in 10.25 at the 1982 European Championships. A month later, he landed his first Italian title in Rieti, winning the final of 100 meters in 10.32. He took part in the European Championships in Amsterdam, where he qualified for the semifinals by winning with a time of 10.19, which was a new Italian junior record. He failed, however, to reach the final by 0.03 seconds. He also ran the final leg of 4×100 relay, landing a 5th place. He participated at the World U20 Championships in Bydgoszcz, where he won the silver medal in 100 meters with 10.24, behind the American Noah Lyles (10.17). In the same championship he participated in the 4×100 relay where they finished 7th.

At the Tokyo 2020 Summer Olympics, Tortu competed in the men's 100m. He reached the semi-final but did not qualify for the finals. Tortu also ran the anchor leg in the 4×100 relay final, coming from behind to pip the GB team by one-hundredth of a second, running his leg with only 8.845 seconds and winning a historic gold.

National records
 100 metres: 9.99 (+0.2 m/s;  Madrid, 22 June 2018) - former Italian record
 4×100 m relay: 37.50 ( Tokyo, 6 August 2021), he ran final leg in the team with Lorenzo Patta, Marcell Jacobs, Eseosa Desalu

Achievements

Personal bests
Outdoor
100 metres: 9.99 (+0.2 m/s;  Madrid, 22 June 2018)
Fastest 100 metre anchor leg: 8.845 (Tokyo, 5 August 2021)
200 metres: 20.10 (+0.3 m/s;  Eugene, 19 July 2022)
Indoor
60 metres: 6.58 ( Ancona, 20 January 2019)

National titles
 Italian Athletics Championships
 100 metres: 2016
 Italian Athletics Indoor Championships
 60 metres: 2020

See also
 2018 in 100 metres (19th with 9.99)
 2019 in 100 metres (46th with 10.07)
 2020 in 100 metres (15th with 10.07)
 List of Italian records in athletics
 Italian all-time lists - 100 metres
 Italian all-time lists - 200 metres
 Italian national track relay team

References

External links
 

1998 births
Living people
Italian male sprinters
Athletes from Milan
Athletes (track and field) at the 2014 Summer Youth Olympics
World Athletics Championships athletes for Italy
Athletes (track and field) at the 2020 Summer Olympics
Olympic athletes of Italy
Athletics competitors of Fiamme Gialle
Mediterranean Games gold medalists for Italy
Mediterranean Games medalists in athletics
Athletes (track and field) at the 2018 Mediterranean Games
Italian Athletics Championships winners
Medalists at the 2020 Summer Olympics
Olympic gold medalists for Italy
Olympic gold medalists in athletics (track and field)
People of Sardinian descent
European Athletics Championships medalists